Ampthill railway station was built over a mile from the historic market town of Ampthill in the English county of Bedfordshire by the Midland Railway in 1868 on its extension to St. Pancras.

History
Opened by the Midland Railway, it became part of the London, Midland and Scottish Railway during the Grouping of 1923. After passing on to the London Midland Region of British Railways upon nationalisation in 1948, it was then closed by the British Transport Commission.

At the time it was built there were no coaching connections by road, so for a number of years the station was particularly beneficial in providing an outlet for the trade in straw hats, Ampthill's speciality being the "Narrow Improved" version. The station closed in 1959 and the inhabitants were advised to use the "excellent alternative bus service."

About half a mile north of the station is Ampthill Tunnel, increased to two bores when the line was upgraded to four tracks in 1891.

Stationmasters

James W Yaxley 1870 - 1875
F. Tomblin 1875 - 1880
John William Brookes 1880 - 1882 
Joseph Minney 1882 - 1898
George Bailey 1898 - 1908 
Robert Henry Turner 1908 -  ca. 1914
O.P. Pitman ca. 1931 - 1937
H.R. Ross until 1947
W.T. Abrahams 1949-1953

Present and future
Trains on the Midland Main Line, electrified through the former station, still pass the site.

The area in which Ampthill station was situated is still visible today due to the widening of tracks where the now long gone platforms used to be.

The Bedfordshire Railway & Transport Association is campaigning for the reopening of a station at Ampthill.

References

Sources

External links 
 Station on navigable O.S. map.

Former Midland Railway stations
Railway stations in Great Britain opened in 1868
Railway stations in Great Britain closed in 1959
Disused railway stations in Bedfordshire
Ampthill